The 50 meter pistol, formerly and unofficially still often called Free Pistol, is one of the ISSF shooting events. It provides the purest precision shooting among the pistol events, and is one of the oldest shooting disciplines, dating back to the 19th century and only having seen marginal rule changes since 1936. Most of the changes concern distance (30m, 50m, 50 Yards), caliber (.22 .22lr .44CF), type of pistol (revolver only, revolver or pistol, any pistol), time allowed (16 hours, 6 hours, 3 hours, 2 hours, 1 hour and 15 minutes), and most recently, format of the finals (carry over scores, start from zero, number of shots fired in the finals). The target of this event has not changed since 1900, and the 50m distance has remained the standard since 1912. Competitors have been using the small-bore, rim-fire cartridge since 1908. The sport traced back to the beginning of indoor Flobert pistol parlor shooting in Europe during the 1870s, which in turn traced back to 18th-century pistol dueling.

The pistol used must be chambered in caliber .22 Long Rifle ammunition, may only be loaded with one round at a time, and must have conventional "open" or "iron" sights (i.e. optical and laser sights are not allowed). It must also be held and operated by one hand, and not supported by any other part of the shooter's body. Apart from that, there are practically no rules for the pistol, explaining the former name of the event. Trigger weight may be as low as the shooter pleases, the grip may be designed in any way to enhance comfortable ergonomic fit as long as it does not touch the wrist for support, and there are no restrictions on size and weight. Precision pistols with long barrels, grips fitted to the shooter's hand, very light trigger pull, etc., are often themselves called free pistols.

The course of fire is 60 shots within a maximum time of two hours. The target is the same as in 25 meter center-fire pistol, but at double the distance, resulting in a lower result level. 570 out of the maximum 600 is considered a world-class result. The current world record, 583, was achieved in the World shooting Championships Granada in 2014 by the South Korean Jin Jong-oh. The previous world record of 581 points was scored by Kyrgyzstan-born Alexander Melentyev in the 1980 Moscow games, stood for 34 years, and still remains the Olympic record.

Most shooters excelling in 50 m pistol also compete at the same level in 10 meter air pistol, a similar precision event.

The Olympic Committee officially dropped 50 m Pistol as a medal event in meetings held in 2018, making the Rio games of 2016 the last for the "Free Pistol" shooters. However, it is still part of other major ISSF competitions; most notably the World Shooting Championships.



World Championships, Men

World Championships, Men Team

World Championships, total medals

World Cup Final
ISSF has introduced a series of World Cup competitions for Olympic shooting events in 1986, and the final has been held at the end of each season since 1988.

Current world records

Olympic and World Champions

Jin Jong-oh is the only triple (and double) Olympic champion in 50 metre pistol; he is the only shooter to have won three consecutive Olympic gold medals in one event. World Championships were held annually up to the 1931 then biennially until 1954 (the current quadrennial format was introduced afterwards), which made a few long streaks possible, but after World War II few shooters have been able to win two major World-level titles (the Olympics and the World Championships); Jin is the only one to have won three or more since the World Championships intervals were changed to the current quadrennial format. Paul Van Asbroeck has won the most of Olympic and World titles combined with seven titles (1 Olympics and 6 World titles). Torsten Ullman won six (1 Olympic, 5 World titles) over the span of 1933–1952, including four successive Championships between 1933 and 1937 (including the 1936 Summer Olympics). Wilhem Schnyder won four consecutive World Championships between 1924 and 1928. Van Asbroeck, Ullman, Huelet Benner and Jin are only ones to have held the Olympic and the World titles simultaneously.

Another rare double is that between this precision event and its direct opposite 25 meter rapid fire pistol; this has only been accomplished by Alfred Lane (completed in 1912), Torsten Ullman (1939), Huelet Benner (1952) and Pentti Linnosvuo (1964), with Lane (in one Olympics) and Linnosvuo winning only Olympic titles. Benner, on the other hand, is the only shooter with two titles in both events. Several athletes have won 50 metre pistol and 10 metre air pistol titles; Jin is the only person to have done so at the (single) Olympics.

ISSF World Cup Series has been held since 1986 with the World Cup Final at the end of the season since 1988; Ragnar Skanåker and Jin are the only two to have won this competition as well as the Olympic and World titles. Skanåker's 1993 World Cup Final victory was achieved at the age of 59; it was also his last international victory.

The distance of the Free Pistol event was 30 metres initially.  This was because 30 metres was used in the German Championship, the most important competition at the time.  Starting from the 1900 Olympics, which also served as the first world championship for Free Pistol, the distance was set to 50 metres.  Both the distance and the target remained the same to this day, with the exception of the 1908 Olympics in which the distance changed from 50 metres to 50 yards.

Free Pistol was not held between the 1920 and 1936 Olympics.  This is due to the perception of the time that pistol shooters, especially in free pistol, were professionals who competed in tournaments which awarded prized money. The strict amateur status required by the IOC ran counter against UIT (ISSF) and the money and medal awarding system of the target pistol shooting competition tradition. The best shooters in the world such as Wilhelm Schnyder and his Swiss teammates with their Häuptli pistols would dominate the world championships, but were denied the chance to compete in the Olympics.  With the exception of 1923 when they did not compete, from 1921 to 1939 the Swiss either won the individual or the team World titles, or both.  Adolf Hitler made sure shooting was part of the 1936 program as he was eager to demonstrate his country's military prowess, including a brand-new special-designed Walther pistol for the rapid fire event.

1 The Olympic competitions in Paris also counted as the 1900 World Championships.
<small>2 Same model as MP33.  Name changed by new company owner.

References

ISSF shooting events
Handgun shooting sports